Jalzicaphaenops poljaki is a species of beetle in the family Carabidae, the only species in the genus Jalzicaphaenops.

References

Trechinae